Marcus William Robertson (February 12, 1870 – May 24, 1948) was a United States Army soldier and a recipient of America's highest military decoration—the Medal of Honor—for his actions during the Philippine–American War.

Marcus Robertson enlisted in the United States Army from Hood River, Oregon in May 1898, and, by May 16 1899, was serving as a private in Company B of the 2nd Oregon Volunteer Infantry Regiment as part of Young's Scouts. On that day, near San Isidro in the Philippines, Private Robertson helped to rout a large enemy force despite being greatly outnumbered. For his actions, he was presented with the Medal of Honor on April 28, 1906. He later rose to the rank of stable Sergeant and served in France during World War I.

He died at age 78 and was buried in Pine Grove Cemetery, Hood River, Oregon.

Medal of Honor citation
Rank and organization: Private, Company B, 2nd Oregon Volunteer Infantry. Place and date: Near San Isidro, Philippine Islands, May 16, 1899. Entered service at: Hood River, Oreg. Birth: Flintville, Wisconsin Date of issue: April 28, 1906.

Citation

"With 21 other scouts charged across a burning bridge, under heavy fire, and completely routed 600 of the enemy who were entrenched in a strongly fortified position."

See also

List of Medal of Honor recipients

Gallery

References

External links

1870 births
1948 deaths
Military personnel from Wisconsin
United States Army Medal of Honor recipients
American military personnel of the Philippine–American War
United States Army personnel of World War I
United States Army soldiers
People from Hood River, Oregon
People from Suamico, Wisconsin
Philippine–American War recipients of the Medal of Honor